Han Ji-wan (born August 14, 1987) is a South Korean actress and model. She is known for her drama roles in Rugal, Search: WWW and I Do, I Do.

Biography and career
She was born on August 14, 1987 in South Korea. She attended Chung-Ang University to study acting and theater. After completing her studies, she signed with Gtree Creative Agency and made her acting debut in 2010 in the movie The Most Beautiful Picnic in The World. She has appeared in numerous television dramas, including I Do, I Do, Search: WWW and My Unfamiliar Family. She was praised for her role as villainess heiress in drama Rugal as Choi Ye-won. The very same she also appeared in drama Lonely Enough to Love as Choi Kyung-won starring with Kim So-eun, Park Geon-il and Ji Hyun-woo.

Filmography

Television series

Film

References

External links
 
 

1987 births
Living people
21st-century South Korean actresses
South Korean female models
South Korean television actresses
South Korean film actresses